Dutch speakers, or , are globally concentrated in the Netherlands, Belgium (Flanders), and Suriname. Dutch is also spoken in minority areas through Europe and in many immigrant communities in all over the world. Afrikaans is a daughter language of Dutch, but is regarded as a separate language and will not be analyzed in this article.

Statistics

Native speakers

See also
 Geolinguistics

Notes

References